The North Fork Solomon River is a river in the central Great Plains of North America. Its entire  length lies within the U.S. state of Kansas. It is a tributary of the Solomon River.

Geography
The North Fork Solomon River originates in the High Plains of northwest Kansas. From there, it flows generally east-northeast into the Smoky Hills region of north-central Kansas. Southeast of Phillipsburg, Kansas, the river joins its tributary Bow Creek to feed Kirwin Reservoir. From the reservoir's dam, the river flows east, then turns southeast near Gaylord, Kansas. Immediately south of Cawker City in northwestern Mitchell County, the North Fork joins the South Fork Solomon River to feed Waconda Lake.

History
In 1955, the U.S. Bureau of Reclamation completed a dam on the river immediately south of Kirwin, Kansas for flood control, creating Kirwin Reservoir.

See also
List of rivers of Kansas

References

Rivers of Kansas